Live in Hyde Park is the first live album released by American band Red Hot Chili Peppers, recorded over three record-breaking nights at Hyde Park, in London on June 19, 20 and 25, 2004 during the band's Roll on the Red Tour. These three concerts set records for the highest-grossing concerts at a single venue in history. This double album compiled from these three shows went straight to No. 1 in the UK and stayed there for two weeks, selling over 120,000 copies.

Of the eight studio albums by the Red Hot Chili Peppers that were released prior to Live in Hyde Park, only three are actually represented in this album's set list – their fifth, Blood Sugar Sex Magik, seventh, Californication, and eighth, By the Way (the single "Fortune Faded", however, was featured solely on the band's Greatest Hits compilation). "Under the Bridge" and "Give It Away" were the only songs from Blood Sugar Sex Magik. The songs "Leverage of Space" and "Rolling Sly Stone" are exclusive to this collection.

There are 4 songs that were also performed but are not included on this release, "I Like Dirt" and "My Lovely Man" were both performed on June 19, "Maybe" (The Chantels cover) on June 20 and "Mini-Epic (Kill for Your Country)" on June 25. "Mini-Epic" was originally planned for this release, but did not make it into the CD versions, probably due to delicate issues concerning the theme of the song. However, it was eventually officially released for the first time in 2015 on the Red Hot Chili Peppers' next live album, Cardiff, Wales: 6/23/04.

Track listing
Disc 1
 "Intro" – 3:57
 "Can't Stop" – 5:13
 "Around the World" – 4:12
 "Scar Tissue" – 4:08
 "By the Way" – 5:20
 "Fortune Faded" – 3:28
 "I Feel Love" (Donna Summer cover) – 1:28
 "Otherside" – 4:34
 "Easily" – 5:00
 "Universally Speaking" – 4:16
 "Get on Top" – 4:06
 "Brandy" (Looking Glass cover) – 3:34
 "Don't Forget Me" – 5:22
 "Rolling Sly Stone" – 5:06

Disc 2
 "Throw Away Your Television" – 7:30
 "Leverage of Space" – 3:29
 "Purple Stain" – 4:16
 "The Zephyr Song" – 7:04
 "Californication" – 5:26
 "Right on Time" (Contains the intro of Joy Division's "Transmission") – 3:54
 "Parallel Universe" – 5:37
 "Drum Homage Medley" – 1:29
"Rock and Roll" (Led Zeppelin)
"Good Times Bad Times" (Led Zeppelin)
"Sunday Bloody Sunday" (U2)
"We Will Rock You" (Queen)
 "Under the Bridge" – 4:54
 "Black Cross" (45 Grave cover) – 3:30
 "Flea's Trumpet Treated by John" – 3:28
 "Give It Away" – 13:17

Promotional sampler

A rare four song promotional CD sampler was released in Spain in 2004. The CD contains the songs "Rolling Sly Stone", "Give It Away", "Under the Bridge" and "By the Way".

Personnel
Anthony Kiedis – lead vocals
John Frusciante – guitar, backing vocals
Flea – bass, trumpet, backing vocals
Chad Smith – drums

Charts

Weekly charts

Year-end charts

Certifications

References

Red Hot Chili Peppers live albums
2004 live albums
Warner Records live albums